Abraham ben Isaac or Avraham Ben Yitzhak may refer to:
Abraham ben Isaac Bedersi (13th century), Provençal Jewish poet
Abraham ben Isaac of Granada (13th century), kabbalist
Abraham ben Isaac of Narbonne (c. 1110 – 1158), Provençal rabbi
Avraham Ben-Yitzhak (1883–1950), Israeli Hebrew poet